The Dominican Summer League Reds are a minor league baseball team of the Dominican Summer League. They are located in Boca Chica, Santo Domingo, Dominican Republic, and play their home games at Ciudad de Baseball. The team plays in the Boca Chica Baseball City division and is affiliated with the Cincinnati Reds.

Roster

External links
 DSL Reds

Dominican Summer League teams
Baseball teams in the Dominican Republic
Cincinnati Reds minor league affiliates